Washington Township is one of four townships in Blackford County, Indiana. As of the 2010 census, its population was 873 and it contained 374 housing units. County Commissioners named the township after George Washington in 1833, and it was part of Jay County.  In 1838, Washington Township became part of the newly organized Blackford County.

Geography

Unincorporated towns
 Roll
 Silas (ghost town)

Major highways

Cemeteries
The township contains at least nine cemeteries: Balsley, Center, Hadden, Herbaugh, Leffler, Mills, Roll, Shields, and Schmidt.

References

Citations

References

 Blackford County Historical Society
 U.S. Board on Geographic Names
 United States Census Bureau cartographic boundary files

External links 

 Indiana Township Association
 United Township Association of Indiana

Townships in Blackford County, Indiana
Townships in Indiana
1833 establishments in Indiana
Populated places established in 1833